Michael Zinni (September 10, 1948 – July 29, 2014) was the head coach of the Minnesota State University, Mankato golf team from 2003 to 2009. 
 
Zinni also played on the Champions Tour for senior golfers.  He was the head golf professional at the Mankato Golf Club. Zinni died on July 29, 2014 at Mayo Clinic from a lung infection.

References

External links

American male golfers
PGA Tour Champions golfers
College golf coaches in the United States
Golfers from Minnesota
Minnesota State University Moorhead
1948 births
2014 deaths